Aurusuliana was a Roman Era city located in what was the Roman Province of Byzacena (Roman North Africa) and today modern Tunisia. The exact site of the city remains unknown and a source of some controversy.
It is now generally considered to have been in Tunisia, in the territory of Henchir-Guennara, but Bingham thought it in Tripoliana while others thought Numidia.

The city was also the seat of an ancient Christian Bishopric. and one Bishop Habettus is known from antiquity. The diocese survives today as a titular bishopric of the Roman Catholic Church and the current bishop is Adam Bałabuch of Poland.

See also 
Kamal Hanna Bathish

References

Roman towns and cities in Africa (Roman province)